The NK-33 and NK-43 are rocket engines designed and built in the late 1960s and early 1970s by the Kuznetsov Design Bureau. The NK designation is derived from the initials of chief designer Nikolay Kuznetsov. The NK-33 was among the most powerful LOX/RP-1 rocket engines when it was built, with a high specific impulse and low structural mass. They were intended for the ill-fated Soviet N1F moon rocket, which was an upgraded version of the N1. The NK-33A rocket engine is now used on the first stage of the Soyuz-2-1v launch vehicle. When the supply of the NK-33 engines are exhausted, Russia will supply the new RD-193 rocket engine. It used to be the first stage engines of the Antares 100 rocket series, although those engines are rebranded the AJ-26 and the newer Antares 200 and Antares 200+ rocket series uses the RD-181 for the first stage engines, which is a modified RD-191, but shares some properties like a single combustion chamber unlike the two combustion chambers used in the RD-180 of the Atlas V and the four combustion chambers used in the RD-170 of the Energia and Zenit rocket families, and the RD-107, RD-108, RD-117, and RD-118 rocket engines used on all of the variants of the Soyuz rocket.

Design 

The NK-33 series engines are high-pressure, regeneratively cooled oxygen-rich staged combustion cycle bipropellant rocket engines. The turbopumps require subcooled liquid oxygen (LOX) to cool the bearings. These kinds of burners are highly unusual, since their hot, oxygen-rich exhaust tends to attack metal, causing burn-through failures. The United States had not investigated oxygen-rich combustion technologies until the Integrated Powerhead Demonstrator project in the early 2000s. The Soviets, however, perfected the metallurgy behind this method. The nozzle was constructed from corrugated metal, brazed to an outer and inner lining, giving a simple, light, but strong structure. In addition, since the NK-33 uses LOX and RP-1 as propellants, which have similar densities, a single rotating shaft could be used for both turbopumps. The NK-33 engine has among the highest thrust-to-weight ratio of any Earth-launchable rocket engine; only the NPO Energomash RD-253 and SpaceX Merlin 1D engines achieve a higher ratio. The specific impulse of the NK-33 is significantly higher than both of these engines. The NK-43 is similar to the NK-33, but is designed for an upper stage, not a first stage.  It has a longer nozzle, optimized for operation at altitude, where there is little to no ambient air pressure. This gives it a higher thrust and specific impulse, but makes it longer and heavier. It has a thrust-to-weight ratio of about 120:1.

The predecessors of NK-33 and NK-43 are the earlier NK-15 and NK-15V engines respectively.

The oxygen-rich technology lives on in the RD-170/-171 engines, their RD-180, and recently developed RD-191 derivatives, but these engines have no direct connection to the NK-33 except for the oxygen-rich staged combustion cycle technology, the kerosene/RP-1 fuel, and in case of the RD-191 and its variants like the RD-193 and the RD-181, the single combustion chamber instead of the multiple chambers in previous Russian rocket engines.

History

N-1 

The N-1 launcher originally used NK-15 engines for its first stage and a high-altitude modification (NK-15V) in its second stage.  After four consecutive launch failures and no successes, the project was cancelled.  While other aspects of the vehicle were being modified or redesigned, Kuznetsov improved his contributions into the NK-33 and NK-43 respectively. The 2nd-generation vehicle was to be called the N-1F.  By this point the Moon race was long lost, and the Soviet space program was looking to the Energia as its heavy launcher.  No N-1F ever reached the launch pad.

When the N-1 program was shut down, all work on the project was ordered destroyed. A bureaucrat instead took the engines, worth millions of dollars each, and stored them in a warehouse. Word of the engines eventually spread to the US. Nearly 30 years after they were built, rocket engineers were led to the warehouse. One of the engines was later taken to the US, and the precise specification of the engine was demonstrated on a test stand.

Combustion-chamber design 

The NK-33 closed-cycle technology works by sending the auxiliary engines' exhaust into the main combustion chamber. This made the engine design unique. This technology was believed to be impossible by Western rocket engineers. The fully heated liquid O2 flows through the pre-burner and into the main chamber in this design. One of the controversies in the Kremlin over supplying the engine to the US was that the design of the engine was similar to Russian ICBM engine design. The NK-33's design was used in the later RD-180 engine, which had twice the size of the NK-33. The RD-180 engines were used (as of 2016) to power the Atlas V rocket. This company also acquired a license for the production of new engines.

Sale of engines to Aerojet

About 60 engines survived in the "Forest of Engines", as described by engineers on a trip to the warehouse. In the mid-1990s, Russia sold 36 engines to Aerojet General for $1.1 million each, shipping them to the company facility in Sacramento CA. During the engine test in Sacramento, the engine hit its specifications.
  
Aerojet has modified and renamed the updated NK-33 to AJ26-58, AJ-26-59 and AJ26-62, and NK-43 to AJ26-60.

Kistler K-1 

Kistler Aerospace, later called Rocketplane Kistler (RpK), designed their K-1 rocket around three NK-33s and an NK-43. On August 18, 2006, NASA announced that RpK had been chosen to develop Commercial Orbital Transportation Services for the International Space Station.  The plan called for demonstration flights between 2008 and 2010.  RpK would have received up to $207 million if they met all NASA milestones, but on September 7, 2007, NASA issued a default letter, warning that it would terminate the COTS agreement with Rocketplane Kistler in 30 days because RpK had not met several contract milestones.

Antares 

The initial version of the Orbital Sciences Antares light-to-medium-lift launcher had two modified NK-33 in the first stage, a solid Castor 30-based second stage and an optional solid or hypergolic third stage. The NK-33s were imported from Russia to the United States, modified, and re-designated as Aerojet AJ26s.  This involved removing some electrical harnessing, adding U.S. electronics, qualifying it for U.S. propellants, and modifying the steering system.

In 2010 stockpiled NK-33 engines were successfully tested for use by the Orbital Sciences Antares light-to-medium-lift launcher. The Antares rocket was successfully launched from NASA's Wallops Flight Facility on April 21, 2013.  This marked the first successful launch of the NK-33 heritage engines built in early 1970s.

Aerojet agreed to recondition sufficient NK-33s to serve Orbital's 16-flight NASA Commercial Resupply Services contract.  Beyond that, it had a stockpile of 23 1960s- and 1970s-era engines.  Kuznetsov no longer manufactures the engines, so Orbital sought to buy RD-180 engines. Because NPO Energomash's contract with United Launch Alliance prevented this, Orbital sued ULA, alleging anti-trust violations. Aerojet offered to work with Kuznetsov to restart production of new NK-33 engines, to assure Orbital of an ongoing supply. However, manufacturing defects in the engine's liquid-oxygen turbopump and design flaws in the hydraulic balance assembly and thrust bearings were proposed as two possible causes of the 2014 Antares launch failure. As announced on 5 November 2014, Orbital decided to drop the AJ-26 first stage from the Antares and source an alternative engine. On 17 December 2014, Orbital Sciences announced that it would use the NPO Energomash RD-181 on second-generation Antares launch vehicles and had contracted directly with NPO Energomash for up to 60 RD-181 engines. Two engines are used on the first stage of the Antares 100-series.

Current and proposed uses 

RSC Energia is proposing an "Aurora-L.SK" launch vehicle, which would use an NK-33 to power the first stage and a Blok DM-SL for the second stage.

Soyuz-2-1v 

In the early 2010s the Soyuz launch vehicle family was retrofitted with the NK-33 engine – using the lower weight and greater efficiency to increase payload; the simpler design and use of surplus hardware might actually reduce cost. TsSKB-Progress uses the NK-33 as the first-stage engine of the lightweight version of the Soyuz rocket family, the Soyuz-2-1v. The NK-33A intended for the Soyuz-2-1v was successfully hot-fired on 15 January 2013, following a series of cold-fire and systems tests of the fully assembled Soyuz-1 in 2011–2012. The NK-33 powered rocket was finally designated Soyuz-2-1v, with its maiden flight having taken place on 28 December 2013. One NK-33 engine replaces the Soyuz's central RD-108, with the four boosters of the first stage omitted. A version of the Soyuz rocket with four boosters powered by NK-33 engines (with one engine per booster) has not been built, which results in a reduced payload compared to the Soyuz-2 launch vehicle.

Versions 
During the years there have been many versions of this engine:
 NK-15 (GRAU index 11D51): Initial version for the N1 first stage.
 NK-15V (GRAU index 11D52): Modified NK-15 optimized for vacuum operation, used on the N1 second stage.
 NK-33 (GRAU index 11D111): Improved version for the N1F first stage, never flown.
 NK-43 (GRAU index 11D112): Vacuum-optimized NK-33 for the N1F second stage, never flown.
 AJ26-58 and AJ26-59: Modified NK-33 by Aerojet Rocketdyne. Planned used on the Kistler K-1.
 AJ26-62: Modified NK-33 with additional gimbal mechanism by Aerojet Rocketdyne. Used on the Antares 100-series first stage.
 NK-33A (GRAU index 14D15): Refurbished NK-33. Used on the Soyuz-2-1v first stage.
 NK-33-1: Uprated NK-33 with gimbal mechanism. Planned used on the Soyuz-2.3 core stage.

Gallery

See also
Comparison of orbital rocket engines

References

External links 
 The Engines That Came In From The Cold!, Equinox, Channel Four Television Corporation, 2000.  Documentary video on Russian rocket engine development of the NK-33 and its predecessors for the N1 rocket. (NK-33 story starts at 24:15–26:00 (program shuttered in 1974); the 1990s resurgence and eventual sale of the remaining engines from storage starts at 27:25; first use on a US rocket launch in May 2000.)
 NK-33's specifications
 NK-33 specifications & key components design (in Russian)

Rocket engines of the Soviet Union
Rocket engines using kerosene propellant
Soviet lunar program
Science and technology in the Soviet Union
Antares (rocket family)
Rocket engines using the staged combustion cycle